Osek nad Bečvou is a municipality and village in Přerov District in the Olomouc Region of the Czech Republic. It has about 1,300 inhabitants.

It lies on the Bečva River.

References

Villages in Přerov District